The John T. Loughran Bridge carries U.S. Route 9W (US 9W) over Rondout Creek between Kingston and Port Ewen, New York, United States. It also crosses over Ferry Street on the Kingston side. It is located just downriver from the historic Kingston-Port Ewen Suspension Bridge, which carried 9W until the Loughran Bridge was constructed. It is just upriver from where the Rondout empties into the Hudson River.

It is a continuous girder bridge with four spans, totalling  in length. In 1979, upon its opening, it was dedicated and named for John T. Loughran, a Kingston native whose judicial career was capped by his service as chief judge of the New York Court of Appeals, the state's highest judicial position, from 1945 until his death in 1953.

Its construction required the demolition of a few blocks of the West Strand neighborhood on the north side. This rallied preservationists to get the decaying area, once Kingston's waterfront in the days of the Delaware and Hudson Canal, designated a historic district. It was later listed on the National Register of Historic Places. Today many of the buildings have been renovated and the area is a popular destination for visitors to the city.

See also 
 
 
 
 List of crossings of Rondout Creek

References 

Bridges completed in 1979
Bridges in Ulster County, New York
U.S. Route 9W
Kingston, New York
Continuous truss bridges in the United States
Road bridges in New York (state)
Bridges of the United States Numbered Highway System
Bridges over Rondout Creek
Steel bridges in the United States
Girder bridges in the United States